Thage is a masculine given name. Notable people with the name include:

 Thage Brauer (1894–1988), Swedish Olympic high jumper
 Thage G. Peterson (born 1933), Swedish politician and speaker of the Riksdag
 Thage Pettersson (1922–2009), Swedish shot putter

See also
 Tage

Swedish masculine given names